The Show-Me Conference is a high school athletic conference composed of schools in central Missouri.  The conference comprises smaller to mid-size schools in Class 1, 2, and 3 (in boys' basketball).

Members

See also
 List of high school athletic conferences in Missouri

References

Missouri high school athletic conferences
High school sports conferences and leagues in the United States